Le Canal Nouvelles (LCN) is a Canadian French language discretionary service 24-hour headline news channel owned by Groupe TVA, a division of Québecor. Its broadcasting headquarters are located in Montreal, Quebec. The channel, operated and programmed by the TVA Nouvelles division, was launched on September 8, 1997.

Programming
LCN broadcasts two 30-minute news segments per hour with headlines scrolling at the bottom of the screen.

Québecor also owns the TVA network. Many news reports shown on TVA are also shown on LCN. LCN also runs four TVA-produced newscasts: at 5pm weekdays, and noon/6pm/10pm daily, with the TVA logo superimposed over the LCN logo.

LCN's anchors have included Pierre Bruneau, Réjean Léveillé, Jean-François Guérin, Karine Champagne, Pascale Déry, Julie Marcoux, Mélanie Bergeron and Pierre Cantin.

The channel broadcasts factual current affairs programs, such as Denis Lévesque (hosted by Denis Lévesque, Le Vrai Négociateur (hosted by Claude Poirier), Dumont (hosted by Mario Dumont),  and Franchement Martineau (hosted by Richard Martineau).

Previous logos

LCN HD
A high definition channel called LCN HD was launched as a simulcast of LCN on December 7, 2009.  It is available on Cogeco, Vidéotron, Bell Satellite TV, Bell Fibe and Shaw Direct.

See also
 Television in Quebec
 Culture of Quebec
 Ici RDI, Quebec's other news channel

External links
  

24-hour television news channels in Canada
TVA (Canadian TV network)
Television channels and stations established in 1997
French-language television networks in Canada
Analog cable television networks in Canada
Category C services
Quebec sovereigntist media